Phanogomphus borealis, the beaverpond clubtail, is a species of clubtail dragonfly in the family Gomphidae. It is found in the northeastern United States and southeastern Canada.

Phanogomphus was formerly considered to be a subgenus of Gomphus, but phylogenetic studies have resulted in its promotion to genus rank.

References

Further reading

External links

 NCBI Taxonomy Browser, Phanogomphus borealis

Gomphidae
Insects described in 1901